The Peace & Truce of Future of the Left is the fifth studio album by Future of the Left, released on 8 April 2016 on Prescriptions. Like previous release How to Stop Your Brain in an Accident the album was funded by fan donations via PledgeMusic, the target was reached within 4 hours. Future of the Left released the album to pledges by digital download on 24 March 2016. A bonus EP recorded at the same time as The Peace & Truce of Future of the Left was released in April 2016 titled To Failed States and Forest Clearings.

Track listing
 "If AT&T Drank Tea What Would BP Do" - 3:21
 "In a Former Life" - 2:58
 "Running all over the Wicket" - 3:03
 "Miner's Gruel" - 2:52
 "Grass Parade" - 1:48
 "The Limits of Battleships" - 3:30
 "Back When I Was Brilliant" - 4:02
 "Eating for None" - 2:26
 "Reference Point Zero" - 2:29
 "White Privilege Blues" - 2:38
 "50 Days Before the Hun" - 2:51
 "Proper Music" - 1:56
 "No Son Will Ease their Solitude" - 4:20

Charts

References

2016 albums
Future of the Left albums
Crowdfunded albums